ZettaNet is an Australian network management provider and internet service provider (ISP). ZettaNet provides NBN, fibre-based Ethernet, VoIP, website hosting, data centre colocation and other internet services to customers across Australia. ZettaNet's headquarters are in Perth, Western Australia, with sales offices in Sydney, New South Wales.

History
ZettaNet was originally known as Highway 1 but was renamed  after the merger of six other internet providers, namely Global Dial, Eon, Nerdnet, Worldwide Internet, APIIX and Simtex.

Related companies
ZettaNet provides the backbone network and IP transit for Zettagrid. These companies are related by a common parent.

References

External links 

Internet service providers of Australia
Companies based in Perth, Western Australia
Telecommunications companies established in 1994
Privately held companies of Australia